, translated into English as Troubled Waters and Muddy Bay, is a short story by Japanese writer Ichiyō Higuchi, written and published in 1895. It depicts the fate of a courtesan in the red light district of a nameless town during the Meiji era.

Plot
Nigorie centers around Oriki, the most popular courtesan at the Kikunoi, a brothel in the red light district of an unspecified town, and a group of people connected to her, during the summer Obon festival.

Through her conversations with other prostitutes, and Oriki's accounts in the presence of new customer Yūki Tomonosuke, the reader learns that a previous customer, Genshichi, a futon salesman of moderate affluence, was addicted to Oriki and spent all his money at the brothel. Now that Genshichi has been reduced to the hard labor of a construction worker, forced to move with his wife Ohatsu and his young son Takichi into a smaller flat in a run-down section of town, Oriki rejects seeing him despite his pleas.

Tomonosuke repeatedly questions Oriki during his visits. She reminisces about her poor upbringing, which she cites, together with her profession, as the reason for not wanting to marry, although she had contemplated the possibility. She recounts a childhood incident when she was seven years old, sent by her mother to buy rice for supper. On her way back, she slipped on the frozen ground, spilling the rice into the gutter, leaving the family starving for this day. 

Meanwhile, Ohatsu scolds Genshichi for his ongoing obsession with Oriki and the family's poverty, which she tries to mitigate by doing piecework. When Takichi comes home with a piece of cake, which he received as a gift from Oriki (whom he refers to as "the demon-lady"), Ohatsu angrily throws it away. Genshichi, furious about her ongoing accusations and behaviour, demands that she leaves him. Ohatsu begs him to let her stay, as she has no relatives she can return to, but finally leaves, taking their son with her.

At the end of the festivities, the dead bodies of Oriki and Genshichi are found. While it seems obvious that Genshichi committed suicide by seppuku, the cause of Oriki's death stays unclear. The passersby speculate about her fate; while one assumes a shinjū (double love suicide), another one reasons that the wounds on Oriki's body make a murder after her attempted escape more plausible. It is left to the reader to determine the true circumstance of her death.

Writing and publishing history
Nigorie was written by Higuchi in June–July 1895 and originally delivered to Ōhashi Otowa, the editor of Bungei kurabu magazine, with the final chapter missing. Higuchi sketched six different endings for the story, including one in which Tomonosuke takes Oriki away from the Kikunoi, before she chose the now existing ending, which she sent to Otowa in August. Nigorie was published in the September 1895 edition of Bungei kurabu.

Yoshie Wada, editor of Higuchi's diaries, suggested that the character of Tononusuke was based on novelist Tōsui Nakarai, her mentor and rumoured lover.

Translations
Nigorie was translated into English in 1958 by Hisako Tanaka under the title Muddy Bay and in 1981 by Robert Lyons Danly under the title Troubled Waters. Seizo Nobunaga provided an English translation under the title In the Gutter (publication date 1953 or 1960, depending on the source). 

Nigorie was also translated from classical Japanese language, in which all of Higuchi's works are written, into modern Japanese in 1996 by Hiromi Itō.

Adaptations
It was entered into the 1954 Cannes Film Festival and won numerous national film prizes.

Nigorie has also repeatedly been adapted for Japanese television, including a version directed by Yasushi Sasaki in 1973 starring Ken Ogata.

Notes

References

Bibliography

1895 short stories
Japanese short stories
Japanese short stories adapted into films
Works by Japanese writers
Literature by women
Works about prostitution in Japan
Meiji period in fiction